José Germán Rosales Gamonal (22 October 1932 – 20 April 2021) was a Chilean journalist, author and radio personality.

Biography 

Gamonal was born in Santiago de Chile. Known for his political journalism, he worked for Radio Minería, El Conquistador FM, Chilean Radio — where he served as the director of the station — and Radio Portales de Santiago, where he represented La Crónica Política programme until his retirement in 2015.

Gamonal died on April 20, 2021 aged 89. On April 22, Senate of Chile stood for a moment's silence to honor him.

Works 

 Jorge Alessandri, the man, the politician (1987).
 History of the elections in Chile, 1920-2005 (2005).

References 

Chilean journalists
Chilean radio personalities
2021 deaths
1932 births
People from Santiago
Chilean political commentators